Putwar Bala is a small village of union council Mathra, Peshawar District, Pakistan. It belongs to the Khalil tribe sub branch "Tapa Barozai."

Populated places in Peshawar District